Rethroned is the second studio album by Finnish symphonic metal band Northern Kings. It was released on November 19, 2008, as a CD in Finland and to download via the European iTunes Store. Upon release, the album entered the Finnish charts at number 16. The album was released in Japan on February 25, 2009, with the Michael Jackson cover "They Don't Care About Us" as a bonus track. The iTunes edition included also the orchestral version of "They Don't Care About Us".

The first single and music video released off this album was the Seal cover "Kiss from a Rose" (originally from the soundtrack of the film Batman Forever). The album also includes two other movie-based tracks: "Training Montage" (from Rocky IV) and "A View to a Kill" (from the 1985 James Bond 007 film of the same title).

Track listing

Personnel
Marko Hietala – vocals
Tony Kakko – vocals
Jarkko Ahola – vocals
Juha-Pekka Leppäluoto – vocals

Additional musicians
Erkka Korhonen (of the Ari Koivunen band) – guitar
Mirka Rantanen – drums  
Mikko P. Mustonen – orchestrations 
Two Finger Choir – backing vocals 
Vili Olila – piano, keyboards 
Erkki Silvennoinen – bass

References

External links 

2008 albums
Northern Kings albums